Sultaana Lakiana Myke Freeman (born 1967) is a Muslim American, resident in the state of Florida. She garnered media attention and notoriety when she sued the state of Florida over the right to wear a face veil for her driver's license picture.

Background
Born as Sandra Michele Keller in Washington, D.C. in 1967, she attended school in Decatur, Illinois. In 1985, she enrolled at Millikin University in Decatur, Illinois, graduating in 1989 with a degree in Commercial Music and a Business Administration minor. Later in 1989, she began employment at a utility company which lasted for a ten-year period, in which she was an engineering assistant. She converted to Islam in January 1997, initially only wearing the headscarf, but, by the end of the year, donning the full face veil (niqab). She married Mark Freeman, also known as Abdul Malik Freeman, on October 14, 1997, in Champaign County, Illinois. In December 1997, she obtained an Illinois driver's license with the veil, to reflect her new appearance.

Timeline
1997
 January - Converts to Islam
 August - Legally changes her forename to "Sultaana"
 October - Meets and marries Abdul-Maalik Freeman
 December - Obtains an Illinois driver's license wearing the face veil in the photo and begins regularly veiling her face while working and elsewhere in public

2001
 February - Sultaana Freeman obtains a Florida driver's license wearing the face veil in the photo
 November/December - Freeman receives two letters demanding her to unveil for a new photo or her current license will be cancelled before expiring

2002
 Jan. 7 - Freeman's license is cancelled
 Jan. 21 - Freeman's lawsuit is filed, represented by lawyer Howard Marks and the American Civil Liberties Union (ACLU)
 June 25 - Plaintiff's Response to Defendant's Motion to Dismiss
 June 27 - Orange County Circuit Judge Ted Coleman denies a motion by the state to dismiss Freeman's lawsuit

2003
 May 27–29 - Freeman vs DMV trial takes place in Orlando residing under Circuit Court Judge Janet C. Thorpe
 June 6 - Janet C. Thorpe rules against Freeman
 July 3 - Freeman appeals
 Oct 31- Freeman files Appellate briefs; awaiting a response from Defendant by the end of the year

2004
 June 9 - Appellate Court Oral arguments

Florida lawsuit
In 2002, Freeman filed a religious discrimination lawsuit against Florida when the state's Department of Highway Safety suspended her license when she refused to be re-photographed without her veil. Her legal license was suspended without change in policy or law following the September 11, 2001 attacks. Her lawsuit argued that her religious beliefs required her to wear a veil "in front of strangers and unrelated males". It also stated that other states allowed photo-free licenses for religious reasons. Judge Janet C. Thorpe denied her lawsuit that year, and a state appeals court later upheld Thorpe's ruling.

It emerged during trial by Assistant Attorney General Jason Vail that pictures of Freeman's uncovered face had already been taken by government authorities in Illinois. In 1998, she and her husband hesitated when medical staff at a hospital asked to examine twin 3-year-old girls, described as in “Muslim attire”, in their foster care. Freeman and her husband apparently objected to any examination of the girls on the grounds that any such exam would violate their religious beliefs. One of the girls had a broken arm, and both had numerous bruises and marks on their bodies. The Freemans did take the girls to the hospital because of their injury.

The arrest not only resulted in Freeman's mugshot being taken without veil, but also in her conviction for aggravated battery and a sentence of 18 months probation. 

In 1999, Freeman again posed for a police mugshot in connection with her husband's arrest on July 4. She was not charged but her husband was later convicted of reckless discharge of a handgun and sentenced to probation. Mazen Sukkar, a Lebanese-born immigration attorney, told the Fort Lauderdale Sun-Sentinel: "This is not Muhammad Ali refusing to kill during a war. This is one individual who wants to practice her religion and undermine the whole idea of identification."

See also
Hijab
Niqab

References

External links
Court TV coverage; accessed November 15, 2014.
Freeman's Brief to the Florida Appellate court; accessed November 15, 2014.

1967 births
Converts to Islam 
Islamic female clothing
Islam-related controversies in North America
Living people
People from Decatur, Illinois
People from Washington, D.C.
American Muslims
Millikin University alumni
Date of birth missing (living people)